Jordi Domingo Coll (born 1 August 1981) is a Spanish equestrian. He competed in the individual dressage event at the 2008 Summer Olympics.

References

External links
 

1981 births
Living people
Spanish male equestrians
Olympic equestrians of Spain
Equestrians at the 2008 Summer Olympics
Sportspeople from Barcelona